This article details the qualifying phase for breaking at the 2024 Summer Olympics. The competition at these Games will comprise a total of 32 breakdancers (16 B-Boys and 16 B-Girls) coming from their respective NOCs with a maximum of two per gender. All breakdancers must endure a tripartite qualifying route to earn a spot for the Games through the following tournaments: the 2023 WDSF World Championships, the continental championships (European Games, Asian Games, Pan American Games, African Championships, and Oceania Championships), and the four-month-long Olympic Qualifier Series.

Summary
A total of 32 breakdancers (sixteen per gender) will compete in the B-Boys and B-Girls dual battle for Paris 2024. Each NOC could only send a maximum of four breakdancers with an equal split between B-Boys and B-Girls. Quota places are allocated to the athletes by name. These qualification spots will be awarded as follows: 
 World Championships – The B-Boy and B-Girl champion at the 2023 WDSF World Championships, scheduled for 23 to 24 September in Leuven, Belgium, will obtain a quota place, respecting a two-breakdancer NOC limit per gender.
 Continental Qualification Events – The highest-ranked eligible B-Boy and B-Girl at each of the five continental qualifying tournaments (Africa, Asia, Europe, the Americas, and Oceania) will obtain a quota place, respecting a two-breakdancer NOC limit per gender. If two breakdancers from the same NOC dominate the WDSF World Championships and their respective continental qualification tournament, the former will qualify directly for the Games with the latter providing another opportunity to book another slot for his or her NOC through the Olympic Qualifier Series (OQS).
 Olympic Qualifier Series – The top seven B-Boys and B-Girls eligible for qualification after a four-month-long invitational series of events will obtain a quota place, respecting a two-breakdancer NOC limit.
 Host country – As the host country, France reserves one quota place each for the B-Boys and B-Girls events. If one or more French breakdancers qualify directly through any of the tripartite routes (world championships, continental meets, or Olympic Qualifier Series), the host country slots will be reallocated to the next highest-ranked eligible breakdancer from OQS.
 Universality places – Two invitational places will be entitled to eligible NOCs interested to have their breakdancers compete in Paris 2024 as abided by the Universality principle.

Qualified countries

Timeline

Events

B-Boys

B-Girls

References

Qualification for the 2024 Summer Olympics
Qualification